William Anthony Wynne (March 29, 1922 – April 19, 2021) was an American author, photographer, award-winning photojournalist, and community advocate. He was also known as a decorated veteran, having owned and trained Smoky the Dog during World War II.

Early life and education
Wynne was born in Scranton, Pennsylvania, in March 1922, to Martin A. and Beatrice Caffrey Wynne. He grew up in Cleveland, Ohio, after moving there as an infant.

He attended West Technical High School in Cleveland, before graduating from the USAAF Photo Lab Technician School at Lowry Field and then the Aerial Photo School in Colorado Springs, Colorado.

Military service
Wynne served in World War II, enlisting on January 12, 1943. He was discharged on November 27, 1945. During this time he served 24 months in the Southwest Pacific and the Far East with the 26th Photo Recon Squadron and the 6th Photo Recon Group, and at New Guinea, Biak Island, Luzon, Okinawa, and Korea.

As aerial photographer, he flew 13 combat missions with the 3rd Emergency Rescue Squadron from Biak Island to Ceram, Halmahera, Celebes, Borneo, and Mindanao between September and December 1944.

With the 26th Photo Recon Squadron, he also worked as a lab technician and as a camera installer on F-5 Lightning (Photo Recon P-38s) reconnaissance planes.

Smoky
While stationed on the Island of New Guinea, Wynne bought a Yorkshire Terrier, which he later named Smoky, from a fellow soldier for two Australian pounds.

Their adventures together ranged from flying in PBY Catalinas to assisting engineers with getting the communications operational at an airbase at Lingayen Gulf, Luzon, where Wynne had Smoky drag a telegraph wire, tied to her collar, under a runway, through a  culvert only  in diameter, reduced in places by silt. Wynne and Smoky also entertained troops and wounded. After the war, Wynne brought Smoky back to the United States. After a brief stint in Hollywood, they starred on their own shows on all three television channels Cleveland had at the time.

"Corporal" Smoky died at the age of 14 on February 20, 1957.

Personal life
Wynne married Margaret Roberts on September 28, 1946, and they remained married for over 57 years until her death in 2004. They had nine children. 
He died in Westlake, Ohio in April 2021 at the age of 99. At the time of his death he had 27 grandchildren, 41 great-grandchildren and 1 great-great grandchild.

Awards
For this military service, Wynne was awarded two U.S. Presidential Unit Citations and eight Battle Stars.

On October 28, 2009, Wynne was inducted into the Ohio Press and Journalism Hall of Fame in Cleveland, Ohio.

Books
Yorkie Doodle Dandy - CO: Top Dog Enterprises, LLC, 1996.

References

1922 births
2021 deaths
American photojournalists
Dog trainers
Military personnel from Cleveland
Writers from Cleveland
Military personnel from Pennsylvania
Writers from Scranton, Pennsylvania
United States Army Air Forces personnel of World War II
United States Army Air Forces soldiers